The athletics competition at the 2009 Summer Universiade was held at the Stadion Crvena Zvezda in Belgrade, Serbia from July 7 to July 12, 2009.

Medal summary

Men's events

Women's events

Medal table

Participating nations

 (1)
 (3)
 (14)
 (37)
 (5)
 (2)
 (1)
 (10)
 (9)
 (1)
 (17)
 (11)
 (5)
 (11)
 (2)
 (27)
 (2)
 (37)
 (8)
 (2)
 (5)
 (7)
 (3)
 (8)
 (16)
 (14)
 (5)
 (3)
 (15)
 (12)
 (9)
 (20)
 (18)
 (23)
 (3)
 (3)
 (7)
 (14)
 (6)
 (13)
 (30)
 (30)
 (1)
 (14)
 (12)
 (5)
 (1)
 (22)
 (6)
 (1)
 (2)
 (5)
 (7)
 (4)
 (9)
 (5)
 (2)
 (10)
 (3)
 (1)
 (7)
 (4)
 (4)
 (1)
 (29)
 (11)
 (1)
 (2)
 (3)
 (19)
 (68)
 (1)
 (10)
 (7)
 (47)
 (1)
 (8)
 (19)
 (34)
 (18)
 (18)
 (2)
 (1)
 (2)
 (12)
 (2)
 (1)
 (11)
 (1)
 (9)
 (23)
 (16)
 (2)
 (2)
 (5)
 (2)

References
Day reports
van Kuijen, Hans (2009-07-12). Friedrich 2m; gold for hosts, two for Iran – World University Games, Final Day. IAAF. Retrieved on 2009-07-23.
van Kuijen, Hans (2009-07-12). Impressive Triple Jump; Japanese sweep half marathon at World University Games, Day 5 . IAAF. Retrieved on 2009-07-23.
van Kuijen, Hans (2009-07-11). World Champion Heidler hammers 75.83m, as Games' records highlight World University Games - Day 4. IAAF. Retrieved on 2009-07-23.
van Kuijen, Hans (2009-07-10). Evora adds another title to his impressive CV – World University Games, Day 3. IAAF. Retrieved on 2009-07-23.
van Kuijen, Hans (2009-07-09). Gold for Serbian junior Spanovic in Long Jump – World University Games Day 2. IAAF. Retrieved on 2009-07-23.
van Kuijen, Hans (2009-07-08). 65.46m African record in the Javelin Throw for Viljoen in Belgrade – World University Games Day 1. IAAF. Retrieved on 2009-07-23.
Results (Archived)

 
2009 Summer Universiade
Universiade
Athletics at the Summer Universiade
2009 Universiade